"Only Know I Do" is a song recorded by Canadian country music artist Adam Gregory. It was released in 2000 as the second single from his debut album, The Way I'm Made. It peaked at number 4 on the RPM Country Tracks chart in October 2000.

Chart performance

Year-end charts

References

2000 songs
2000 singles
Adam Gregory songs
Epic Records singles
Songs written by Jamie Houston (songwriter)